Route 44T, also known as the Gloucester County Tunnel, was a proposed state highway and vehicular tunnel during the 1930s from Gloucester County, New Jersey to Philadelphia County, Pennsylvania. The route was to begin at the state line near Paulsboro, New Jersey, heading eastward as a freeway through several southern New Jersey communities and providing access from New Jersey Route 42 to the Delaware River. 

The plans for the original freeway date back to 1930, when the original studies and requests were decided on by the New Jersey State Legislature. Plans soon followed in Pennsylvania, but after three years of receiving approval, the Gloucester County Tunnel experienced several setbacks. In 1938, the New Jersey State Legislature designated the State Highway Route 44-T designation, as a suffixed tunnel spur of New Jersey Route 44. By the 1953 renumbering, Route 44-T was already repealed and decommissioned while the tunnel was never constructed by the Gloucester County Tunnel Commission.

Route description
State Highway Route 44-T was designated to start at the Pennsylvania state line near the community of Paulsboro along the Gloucester County Tunnel. Route 44-T would then head eastward along the tunnel, coming ashore in Paulsboro and onto lands in New Jersey. In New Jersey, the highway was proposed to head eastward along the Pine Barrens region as a freeway, interchanging with State Highway Route 44 (also designated U.S. Route 130) in Paulsboro. From there, it would head to the northeast, interchanging with State Highway Route 45 further east. From that point, the highway was to continue eastward, interchanging with State Highway Route 47 in Blackwood. After interchanging with State Highway Route 41 in Blackwood, Route 44-T would head eastward, interchanging with State Highway Route 42 (also designated U.S. Route 322) in Williamstown, where the designation would terminate.

History

The plans for a tunnel across the Delaware River from Gloucester County, New Jersey to Philadelphia, Pennsylvania date back to 1930, when the state of New Jersey set aside funding to study the feasibility of such an accomplishment. The origination for the tunnel were by local businessmen and officials who suggested another crossing across the Delaware after the success with the Benjamin Franklin Bridge. This coincided with plans in 1930 to build new tunnels from New York to New Jersey and vice versa with Pennsylvania. The states of New Jersey and Pennsylvania continued further interest, with Governor Gifford Pinchot signing a preliminary bill at Harrisburg, Pennsylvania on December 23, 1933 for a new tunnel. In May 1935, the New Jersey State Highway Department started purchasing lands around the proposed tunnel location in Paulsboro for the construction, which as proposed would take about two years to construct and provide 4,000 jobs to men in the region. In 1937, the Gloucester County Tunnel Commission was authorized by legislature to help foresee ownership and construction of the new tunnel, which had yet to be constructed. After another year of financial setbacks, the permits to the construct the Gloucester County Tunnel was approved once again, despite protests by officials in Philadelphia. The project at this point would cost $17.5  million (1938 USD) to construct. The Pennsylvania State Legislature in Harrisburg performed the same actions a year later.

As a result of the signing of the roadway in New Jersey, the New Jersey State Legislature set forth the proposed designation of State Highway Route 44-T as the approaches to the tunnel and a freeway built off the tunnel. The designation came as a spur of U.S. Route 130/State Highway Route 44 in Paulsboro. A year later, the Route 44-T designation was extended to end at State Highway Route 42 in Williamstown. Although plans for a tunnel continued into the late 1940s, no tunnel was ever constructed, and the Route 44-T designation was repealed by the state highway renumbering on January 1, 1953.

Major intersections

See also

Benjamin Franklin Bridge
New Jersey Route 324

References

External links 

044T
Transportation in Gloucester County, New Jersey
Delaware River